Sacodes pulchella, the beautiful marsh beetle, is a species of marsh beetle in the family Scirtidae. It is found in North America.

References

Further reading

External links

 

Scirtoidea
Articles created by Qbugbot
Beetles described in 1843